Grace Memorial Episcopal Church may refer to:

Grace Memorial Episcopal Church (Hammond, Louisiana), listed on the National Register of Historic Places (NRHP) in Tangipahoa Parish
Grace Memorial Episcopal Church (Wabasha, Minnesota), NRHP-listed in Wabasha County

See also
Grace Church (disambiguation)